The Spanish Classic was a women's professional golf tournament on the Ladies European Tour held at La Manga Club in Spain between 1989 and 1992.

Winners

Source:

See also
La Manga Spanish Open

References

External links
Ladies European Tour

Former Ladies European Tour events
Golf tournaments in Spain
Recurring sporting events established in 1989
Recurring sporting events disestablished in 1992